Cubonia is a genus of fungi in the Ascobolaceae family. The genus contains three species found in Europe.

References

External links

Fungi of Europe
Pezizales
Pezizales genera